Luther Burbank Home and Gardens is a city park containing the former home, greenhouse, gardens, and grave of noted American horticulturist Luther Burbank (1849-1926). It is located at the intersection of Santa Rosa Avenue and Sonoma Avenue in Santa Rosa, California, in the United States. The park is open daily without charge; a fee is charged for guided tours. It is designated as a National Historic Landmark as well as a California Historical Landmark (#234).

History
Burbank lived in Santa Rosa for more than 50 years, and performed the bulk of his life's work at this location. From 1884 to 1906 he lived in this park's Greek Revival house; he then moved across Tupper street to a house that no longer exists. After Burbank's death in 1926, his widow Elizabeth moved back to the house, where she remained until her death in 1977.

Burbank, a native of Massachusetts, was a nationally known figure who was responsible for creating many new varieties of plants.  He is credited with introducing more than 250 new varieties of fruit, including a large number of plum varieties that are widely used in agriculture.  A portion of the property was declared a National Historic Landmark in 1964.  The site is included n the official Santa Rosa historic landmarks and the Sonoma County Historical Society list of landmarks.

Gardens
The gardens include many of Burbank's horticultural introductions, with collections of cactus, fruit trees, ornamental grasses, medicinal herbs, roses, and walnuts. Most plants are labeled with botanic and common names. The garden's greenhouse was designed and built by Burbank in 1889; Burbank's grave is nearby, underneath a Cedar of Lebanon.

See also 
 Gold Ridge Farm — Burbank's  experimental farm nearby in Sebastopol.
 Luther Burbank Rose Parade and Festival
 Botanical gardens in California
 List of botanical gardens in the United States
 List of botanical gardens and arboretums in California
 List of National Historic Landmarks in California

References

External links 

Botanical gardens in California
Farm museums in California
Houses in Santa Rosa, California
Historic house museums in California
Museums in Santa Rosa, California
Parks in Sonoma County, California
California Historical Landmarks
National Historic Landmarks in the San Francisco Bay Area
National Register of Historic Places in Sonoma County, California
Houses on the National Register of Historic Places in California
Gardens in California
History of Sonoma County, California
Greek Revival houses in California